David Smith Monson (born June 20, 1945) is an American politician 
and former U.S. Representative and the second Lieutenant Governor of Utah. He is a member of the Republican Party.

Born in Salt Lake City, Utah, Monson attended public schools. He earned a B.S. from the University of Utah in 1970. He became a certified public accountant afterwards. He also served as a Sergeant in the Utah Air National Guard from 1967 to 1973.

Monson was elected Utah State Auditor in 1972. He was one of only two Republicans to win a statewide office that year, the rest being taken by the Democrats. He served from 1973 to 1977. He then served as lieutenant governor of Utah for two terms, from 1977 to 1985.

In 1984, Monson ran for the United States House of Representatives for the Ninety-ninth Congress. He had a difficult race due to reports of his going on a trade mission to Japan along with a man who was later accused of spying and a developer who had been accused of defrauding investors. In the general election, he defeated former state Senator Frances Farley by a vote of 105,540 to 105,044. He was not a candidate for reelection in 1986, ending his political career on January 3, 1987 after serving only one term as a representative. He subsequently became a business executive involved in international trade and recycling paper. He currently resides in Salt Lake City.

Monson is a member of the Church of Jesus Christ of Latter-day Saints.

References

External links

1945 births
Living people
Latter Day Saints from Utah
Lieutenant Governors of Utah
University of Utah alumni
Republican Party members of the United States House of Representatives from Utah
Politicians from Salt Lake City